HMS Medway was a 74-gun third rate ship of the line of the Royal Navy, launched on 19 November 1812 at Northfleet.

Naval service
At 7am on 4 July 1814, Medway was under the command of Captain Augustus Brine when she encountered the USS Syren, a 16-gun United States brig. An eleven-hour chase ensued, with Syrens crew throwing their cannons, anchors and ballast overboard in the hope of escaping the pursuing British vessel. Their efforts were insufficient and the American vessel was surrendered at sunset. Her crew of 137 men were taken prisoner, and her cargo of ivory impounded and later paid out to Medways crew as prize money for the capture.

Medway was converted to serve as a prison ship at the Royal Naval Dockyard on Ireland Island in Bermuda in 1847. The colony had been selected for development as the primary British naval and military base in the North American and West Indian region following the loss of all British ports between Nova Scotia and the West Indies with American Independence. Bermuda's manpower was entirely devoted to shipbuilding and seafaring, and the shortage of cheap manual labour led the Admiralty to import convicts from British and Irish prisons, who were housed in hulks like the Medway. Conditions for the convicts were harsh, and discipline was draconian.

In 1849, convict James Cronin, on Medway, was placed in solitary confinement from the 25th to the 29th for fighting. On release, and being returned to work, he refused to be cross-ironed. He ran onto the breakwater, brandishing a poker threateningly. For this, he was ordered to receive punishment (presumably flogging) on Tuesday, 3 July 1849, with the other convicts aboard the hulk assembled behind a rail to witness. When ordered to strip, he hesitated. Thomas Cronin, his older brother, addressed him and, while brandishing a knife, rushed forward to the separating rail. He called out to the other prisoners in Gaelic and many joined him in attempting to free the prisoner and attack the officers. The officers opened fire. Two men were killed and twelve wounded. Punishment of James Cronin was then carried out. Three hundred men of the 42nd Regiment of Foot, in barracks on Ireland Island, responded to the scene under arms.

Medway was sold out of the Navy in 1865.

Notes, citations, and references
Notes

Citations

References

 Hannings, Bud. (2012). The War of 1812: A Complete Chronology with Biographies of 63 General Officers. Jefferson, North Carolina: McFarland. 
 Lavery, Brian (2003) The Ship of the Line - Volume 1: The development of the battlefleet 1650-1850. Conway Maritime Press. .

Ships of the line of the Royal Navy
Vengeur-class ships of the line
1812 ships
War of 1812 ships of the United Kingdom